Saurauia serrata is a species of plant in the Actinidiaceae family. It is endemic to Mexico.

References

serrata
Endemic flora of Mexico
Endangered plants
Endangered biota of Mexico
Taxonomy articles created by Polbot
Plants described in 1822
Trees of Mexico
Cloud forest flora of Mexico